Illya Marchenko and Sergiy Stakhovsky were the defending tennis doubles champions, but neither player chose to participate.

Thomaz Bellucci and André Sá won the title, defeating James Cerretani and Andreas Siljeström 5–7, 6–4, [10–8] in the final.

Seeds

Draw

Draw

References
 Main Draw

Doubles
2014 ATP Challenger Tour